Dirty Money is an American reality television show produced by V2 Films and aired on the Discovery Channel. The show features Jimmy DiResta, a New-York-based designer and carpenter, and his brother John DiResta buying or finding discarded and unwanted items and restoring them for sale at their flea market stall.

Episodes

International Broadcast 
The show was aired in the United Kingdom on Quest.

References

External links
 

2011 American television series debuts
2011 American television series endings
2010s American reality television series
Discovery Channel original programming